Old Chapel may refer to:

Old Chapel (Amherst, Massachusetts), also known as Old Chapel Library, a 19th-century building on the campus of the University of Massachusetts Amherst
Old Chapel (Millwood, Virginia), listed on the National Register of Historic Places in Clarke County, Virginia
Old Chapel (Indianola, Iowa), listed on the National Register of Historic Places in Warren County, Iowa
Fulwood Old Chapel, Sheffield, England